Sergei Anatolyevich Kuzmin (born 25 April 1967) is a former Russian professional footballer.

Club career
He made his professional debut in the Soviet Second League in 1988 for FC Lokomotiv Gorky.

References

1967 births
Living people
Soviet footballers
Russian footballers
Association football defenders
FC Lokomotiv Nizhny Novgorod players
FC Tekstilshchik Kamyshin players
FC Torpedo NN Nizhny Novgorod players
Russian Premier League players